Egor Gerasimov was the defending champion and successfully defended his title.

Gerasimov won the title after Sergey Betov retired trailing 6–7(3–7), 0–2 in the final.

Seeds

Draw

Finals

Top half

Bottom half

References
Main Draw
Qualifying Draw

2018 ATP Challenger Tour
2018 Singles